The name Kathleen has been used for six tropical cyclones worldwide. 

In the Eastern Pacific Ocean:
 Tropical Storm Kathleen (1961) – not a threat to land.
 Tropical Storm Kathleen (1968) – not a threat to land.
 Tropical Storm Kathleen (1972) – came close to land.
 Hurricane Kathleen (1976) – Category 1 hurricane, made landfall in Baja as a tropical storm, moved into California and Arizona

In the Western Pacific Ocean:
 Typhoon Kathleen (T4709) – Affected Kantō, Japan

In the Southwest Indian Ocean:
 Cyclone Kathleen (1965)

Pacific hurricane set index articles
Pacific typhoon set index articles
South-West Indian Ocean cyclone set index articles